was a town located in Funai District, Kyoto Prefecture, Japan.

As of 2003, the town had an estimated population of 3,829 and a density of 32.11 persons per km2. The total area was 119.25 km2.

On October 11, 2005, Wachi, along with the towns of Tamba and Mizuho (all from Funai District), was merged to create the town of Kyōtamba.

Schools

Wachi has one elementary school (Wachi Elementary) and one middle school (Wachi Middle School). As of 2010, Wachi Middle School had 97 students.

Transportation

Wachi has three train stations, Wachi Station, Aseri Station, and Tachiki Station. Trains pass through Wachi about once every hour.

External links
 Official website of merged municipalities

Dissolved municipalities of Kyoto Prefecture
Kyōtamba, Kyoto